St. Finbarr's Hospital is a care home for elderly people on the Douglas Road, Cork City, Ireland.

History
The hospital has its origins in the Cork Union Workhouse and Infirmary which was designed by George Wilkinson and completed in 1841. A large three-storey block was added to the north of the site. The facility became the Cork District Hospital in 1898 and later became the Cork County Home and Hospital. It was designated by ministerial order as responsible for the treatment of medical, surgical and maternity cases, and cases of infectious and contagious diseases in 1923.

References

Hospitals in County Cork
Buildings and structures in Cork (city)
Health Service Executive hospitals
Poor law infirmaries
1841 establishments in Ireland
Hospital buildings completed in 1841
Hospitals established in 1841
19th-century architecture in the Republic of Ireland